The 2017 Men's European Volleyball League is the 14th edition of the annual Men's European Volleyball League, which features men's national volleyball teams from eight European countries.

A preliminary league round is played from 9 to 25 June 2017, and the final four tournament from 1 to 2 July 2017 at the Gentofte Sportspark in Gentofte, Denmark.

Teams

League round
All times are local.

Pool A

|}

Week 1
Venue:  SRC Kale, Skopje, Macedonia

|}

Week 2
Venue:  Tirana Olympic Park, Tirana, Albania

|}

Pool B

 

|}

Week 1
Venue:  Physical Education College, Ivano-Frankivsk, Ukraine

|}

Week 2
Venue:  Continental Aréna, Nyíregyháza, Hungary

|}

Final four
The top placed team from each group and the best second-placed team will qualify for the final four. The fourth participant will be the organizer of the tournament.

Qualified teams
 (Host)

Bracket
All times are local
Venue:  Gentoftehallen, Gentofte, Denmark

Semifinals

|}

Third place game

|}

Final

|}

Final standings

Awards 

Most Valuable Player
  Maksym Drozd
Best Setter
  Volodymyr Kovalchuk
Best Outside Spikers
  Oleksiy Klyamar
  Rasmus Breuning Nielsen

Best Middle Blockers
  Maksym Drozd
  Gjoko Josifov
Best Opposite Spiker
  Nikola Gjorgiev
Best Libero
  Anton Wijk Tegenrot

References

External links
Official website

See also
2017 Women's European Volleyball League

2017 Men
European Volleyball League
International volleyball competitions hosted by Denmark
2017 in Danish sport
June 2017 sports events in Europe
July 2017 sports events in Europe